Mosito Lehata (born 8 April 1989 in Maseru) is a Mosotho athlete competing in sprinting events. He is the current holder of the Lesotho national record for the 100-meter at 10.11 seconds, and has consistently won the national track championships on shorter tracks. He was eliminated in the first round of the men's 200 m event at the 2012 Summer Olympics. Lehata found success in the 200 m event at the 2013 World Championships in Athletics when he finished in the first round ahead of Jamaican sprinter Usain Bolt and advanced to the semifinals.  He set a new national record in the 200 m at the 2014 Commonwealth Games, finishing in 4th, four hundredths of a second behind the bronze medal winner.

At the 2016 Summer Olympics, he competed in the 100 m and 200 m events. He finished 4th in his heat for the 100 m with a time of 10.25 seconds and did not qualify for the semifinals. He finished 7th in his heat for the 200 m with a season best time of 20.65 seconds, but did not qualify for the semifinals. He was the flagbearer for Lesotho during the Parade of Nations.

Competition record

1Did not start in the semifinals

2Disqualified in the semifinals

3Did not finish in the semifinals

Personal bests
Outdoor
100 metres – 10.11 (+1.4 m/s, Réduit 2015)
200 metres – 20.36 (+0.5 m/s, Glasgow 2014)
Indoor
60 metres – 7.00 (Istanbul 2012)

References

1989 births
Living people
People from Maseru
Lesotho male sprinters
Olympic athletes of Lesotho
Commonwealth Games competitors for Lesotho
Athletes (track and field) at the 2012 Summer Olympics
Athletes (track and field) at the 2016 Summer Olympics
Athletes (track and field) at the 2010 Commonwealth Games
Athletes (track and field) at the 2014 Commonwealth Games
Athletes (track and field) at the 2018 Commonwealth Games
Athletes (track and field) at the 2015 African Games
Athletes (track and field) at the 2019 African Games
World Athletics Championships athletes for Lesotho
African Games competitors for Lesotho